= Abdel Salam Qaderboh =

Libyan poet

- Born: 1936; Benghazi
- Died: 7 July 1988 (aged 51–52); Benghazi
- Occupation: poet, writer

Abdel Salam Qaderboh (Arabic: عبد السلام قادربوه 1936–1988) was a Libyan poet, writer, teacher, journalist, and researcher in Libyan folk heritage. He is considered one of the most prominent Libyan poets who wrote in both colloquial and classical Arabic. He was also one of the pioneers in writing free verse poetry in Libya.

== Life and career ==
Qaderbouh was born in 1936 in the city of Benghazi, where he received his early education. From a young age, he developed a deep passion for the Arabic language, captivated by its rich synonyms and artistic expressions. In 1953, he began his career as a teacher at the Al-Amir School in Benghazi. His love for Arabic led him into the depths of its poetry, where he initially composed classical Arabic poetry in both traditional and free verse forms. However, it was Libyan songwriting that truly captured his heart. He revitalized its lyrics, moving away from archaic expressions to contemporary Libyan vernacular, marking a significant evolution in the vocabulary of Libyan songs.

== Death ==
He died in Benghazi, on 7 July 1988.
